Abadiyeh (also spelled al-Abadiyah or Aabadiyeh) is a municipality in the Baabda District of Mount Lebanon Governorate, Lebanon. It is located 16 kilometers east of Beirut. There is one public school in the town, which had 345 pupils in 2006. It is the hometown of Lebanese actress Cyrine Abdelnour, Lebanese footballer Zaher Al Indari, and former President of Brazil Michel Temer, Lebanese kick boxing fighter Rabih Zahr, Lebanese Director in Moderna Inc Froncois Nader

Geography
Abadiyeh has a land area of 916 hectares. Its average elevation is 780 meters above sea level. Neighboring localities include Chouit to the west, Beit Mery to the northwest, Ras el-Matn to the north, el-Halaliyeh to the east, Baalchemay to the southeast, and Aley and Ain el-Jdeide to the south.

References

Populated places in Baabda District
Druze communities in Lebanon
Eastern Orthodox Christian communities in Lebanon
Maronite Christian communities in Lebanon